The 2011–12 Lev Poprad season was the Kontinental Hockey League (KHL) franchise's first and last season of play.

Season summary
Almost two months after being officially admitted to the KHL, Lev announced the signings of its first five players on 30 June 2011. In the final roster, the majority of the players were from Slovakia and the Czech Republic. Head coach was Radim Rulik and the team captain was Lubos Bartecko. Lev's regular season was planned to start on 10 September 2011 with a match at home against Avangard Omsk, but because of the 2011 Lokomotiv Yaroslavl plane crash, the start of the season was postponed and Lev had their first game on 12 September against Metallurg Magnitogorsk. However, for their first win they had to wait until the sixth game, a 2–0 away win against Dinamo Riga on 26 September. Lev also failed to qualify for the play-offs and ended the season as 21st overall, with 54 points from 54 games. The team's top scorer was Lubos Bartecko with 30 points (16 goals and 14 assists).

Schedule and results

|-
| || || || || || || || || ||
|-

|-
| || || || || || || || || ||
|-

|-
| || || || || || || || || ||
|-

|-
| || || || || || || || || ||
|-

|-
| || || || || || || || || ||
|-

|-
| || || || || || || || || ||
|-

|-
| style="text-align:center;|

Players
Thirty-three players in all represented the Lev Poprad during their lone season of play and existence. Lubos Bartecko led the team with 16 assists and 30 points, Tomas Netik led them in goalscoring registering 17.  The list of players and 2011–12 regular season statistics are presented below.

See also
2011-12 KHL season

References

HC Lev Poprad seasons
Pop
Pop